Roccellinastrum lagarostrobi is a rare species of byssoid (wispy) lichen in the family Byssolomataceae. Found in Australia, it was formally described as a new species in 1990 by lichenologist Gintaras Kantvilas. It has a white, cottony (byssoid) thallus that forms irregularly shaped tufts typically measuring 2–4 mm wide. The lichen produces the chemical protocetraric acid. The species epithet lagarostrobi refers to the genus of the phorophyte. It is only known to occur at a few locations in Tasmania; its diminutive size and somewhat inconspicuous appearance makes it easy to miss.

References

Pilocarpaceae
Lichen species
Lichens described in 1990
Lichens of Australia
Taxa named by Gintaras Kantvilas